Events in the year 1903 in Norway.

Incumbents
Monarch: Oscar II
Prime Minister: Otto Blehr, then Francis Hagerup

Events

 31 January–6 February – The Nordic Games take place in Kristiania.
 7 April – Fredrikstad Football Club (FFK) is founded
 16 June – Roald Amundsen commences the first east-west navigation of the Northwest Passage by leaving Oslo, Norway.
 10 August – The Oseberg ship, a well-preserved Viking ship from the 9th century, was discovered in a large burial mound at the Oseberg farm near Tønsberg in the Vestfold county.
 22 October – Francis Hagerup succeeded Otto Blehr as Prime Minister of Norway
 The 1903 Parliamentary election takes place.
 Edvard Grieg, in Paris, became the first Norwegian to make gramophone records

Popular culture

Sports

Music

Film

Literature

Births
 
 
5 January – Kirsten Hansteen, politician and Minister, first female member of cabinet in Norway (died 1974).
19 January – Dyre Vaa, sculptor and painter (died 1980).
29 January – Olav Rytter, newspaper editor, radio personality, foreign correspondent, philologist and translator (died 1992)
3 February – Johan Strand Johansen, politician and Minister (died 1970)
25 February – Olav Kjetilson Nylund, politician (died 1957)
17 March – Olav Meisdalshagen, politician and Minister (died 1959)
27 March – Leif Tronstad, scientist, intelligence officer and military organizer (died 1945).
28 March – Hans Kristian Bromstad, politician (died 1971)
24 April – Anders Platou Wyller, philologist and humanist (died 1940)
27 April – Tor Skjønsberg, resistance leader, politician and Minister (died 1993)
28 April – Egil Rasmussen, author, literature critic and musician (died 1964)
2 May – Øivin Fjeldstad, conductor and violinist (died 1983)
19 May – Karl Eugen Hammerstedt, politician (died 1960)
24 May – Gudbrand Bernhardsen Tandberg, politician (died 1949)
26 May – Sverre Helgesen, high jumper (died 1981)
1 June – Hans Vogt, linguist (died 1986)
3 June – Tobias Gedde-Dahl, physician (died 1994).
10 June – Ferdinand Strøm, dentist and a pioneer in developing forensic dentistry in Norway (died 1990).
14 June – Nils Helgheim, politician (died 1982)
17 June – Halvor Bunkholt, politician (died 1978)
25 June – Kai Knudsen, politician (died 1977)
26 June – Iver Johan Unsgård, politician (died 1993)
2 July – Olav V, King of Norway (died 1991)
4 July – Hans Jacob Ustvedt, medical doctor and broadcasting administrator (died 1982)
12 July – Haldis Tjernsberg, politician (died 1972)
31 July – Sigmund Skard, poet, essayist and professor of literature (died 1995)
17 August – Bjarne Amdahl, pianist, composer and orchestra conductor (died 1968).
17 August – Kittill Kristoffersen Berg, politician (died 1983)
17 August – Olav Sunde, javelin thrower and Olympic bronze medallist (died 1985)
29 August – Ole Stenen, Nordic skier, Olympic silver medallist and World Champion (died 1975)
15 September – Trygve Braarud, botanist (died 1985)
24 September – Andreas Martinius Andersen, civil servant.
15 October – Erik Anker, sailor and Olympic gold medallist (died 1994)
7 November – Ståle Kyllingstad, sculptor (died 1987).
20 November – Leif Skagnæs, Nordic combined skier
24 November – Sverre Bernhard Nybø, politician (died 1976)
27 November – Karen Grønn-Hagen, politician and Minister (died 1982)
27 November – Lars Onsager, physical chemist and theoretical physicist, winner of the 1968 Nobel Prize in Chemistry (died 1976)
30 November – Einar Østvedt, historian and educator (died 1980).
6 December – Kristian Hovde, cross country skier (died 1969)
15 December – Georg Braathe, long distance runner (died 1968)

Notable deaths

4 January – Christian Fredrik Sissenèr, property owner and politician (born 1849)
20 March – Carl Anton Bjerknes, mathematician and physicist (born 1825)
17 August – Hans Gude, painter (born 1825)
28 August – Hans Hein Theodor Nysom, politician (born 1845)
10 October – Jacob Thurmann Ihlen, politician (born 1833)
12 October – Olaus Alvestad, educator and newspaper editor (born 1866)
27 October – Erika Nissen, pianist (born 1845)

See also

References